The British Columbia New Democratic Party leadership convention of 2011 was prompted by Carole James's announcement on December 6, 2010 that she would be resigning as leader of the party.  The convention was held on April 17, 2011 at the Vancouver Convention Centre with voting occurring by telephone and via internet on that date and through advance voting.

Adrian Dix was elected leader, narrowly defeating rival Mike Farnworth on the third ballot.

Candidates

Adrian Dix

MLA for Vancouver-Kingsway (2005–present), former Chief of Staff to Premier Glen Clark
Support from caucus members: Harry Bains (Surrey-Newton), Mable Elmore (Vancouver-Kensington), Sue Hammell (Surrey-Green Timbers), Michelle Mungall (Nelson-Creston), Bruce Ralston (Surrey-Whalley)
Support from federal caucus members: Don Davies (Vancouver-Kingsway), Libby Davies (Vancouver East)
Support from former caucus members:  Lois Boone (Prince George North), Pietro Calendino (Burnaby North), Evelyn Gillespie (Comox Valley), Anita Hagen (New Westminster), Joy MacPhail (Vancouver-Hastings, former leader), Jenn McGinn (Vancouver-Fairview), Chuck Puchmayr (New Westminster), Svend Robinson (MP for Burnaby-Douglas)
Date campaign launched: January 16, 2011
Policies: Commit to eliminating the HST, seek to roll back reductions in the corporate tax rate, support the redirection of carbon tax revenue to pay for public transit and infrastructure that reduces greenhouse gas emissions, support an increase in the minimum wage rate to $10 per hour, create a provincial child care system, restore grants to the post-secondary students, reduce interest on student loans, and restore the corporation capital tax on financial institutions.

Mike Farnworth
MLA for Port Coquitlam (1991–2001, 2005–present), former Minister of Municipal Affairs and Housing (1997–98), Minister of Employment and Investment and Minister Responsible for Housing (1998–2000), Minister of Health and Minister Responsible for Seniors (2000), and Minister Social Development and Economic Security (2000–01)
Support from caucus members:  Jagrup Brar (Surrey-Fleetwood), Katrine Conroy (Kootenay West), Doug Donaldson (Stikine), Rob Fleming (Victoria-Swan Lake), Guy Gentner (Delta North), Norm Macdonald (Columbia River-Revelstoke), Lana Popham (Saanich South), Doug Routley (Nanaimo-North Cowichan), Leonard Krog (Nanaimo), Jenny Kwan (Vancouver-Mount Pleasant)
Support from federal caucus members:  Alex Atamanenko (Southern Interior)
Support from former caucus members: Mike Harcourt (Vancouver-Mount Pleasant, former Premier), Gretchen Brewin (Victoria-Beacon Hill), John Cashore (Coquitlam-Maillardville), Barbara Copping (Port Moody-Burnaby Mountain), Corky Evans (Nelson-Creston), Harold Steves (Richmond), Bernie Simpson (Vancouver-Fraserview), Ed Conroy (Rossland-Trail), Joan Sawicki (Burnaby-Willingdon), Dale Lovick (Nanaimo), David Cubberley (Saanich South),
Date campaign launched: January 13, 2011
Policies: Support BC agricultural sector through a BC Food-First policy, a regional 'no net-loss policy' for the Agricultural Land Reserve, remove regulatory disincentives to farm-gate sales, return the investment in agricultural sector to national average (14% of agricultural GDP); revenue sharing with local government from resource extraction, create a Jobs Protection Commissioner, repeal the Significant Projects Streamlining Act

John Horgan
MLA for Malahat-Juan de Fuca (2005–present)
Support from caucus members: Kathy Corrigan (Burnaby-Deer Lake), Scott Fraser (Alberni-Pacific Rim), Maurine Karagianis (Esquimalt-Royal Roads), Harry Lali (Fraser-Nicola), Bill Routley (Cowichan Valley), Nicholas Simons (Powell River-Sunshine Coast), Shane Simpson (Vancouver-Hastings), Claire Trevena (North Island)
Support from former caucus members: Lynn Hunter (former MP for Saanich-Gulf Islands), Bob Skelly (Alberni, MP for Comox-Alberni, former leader), Ray Skelly (MP for North Island--Powell River), Jim Manly (MP for Cowichan—Malahat—The Islands)
Date campaign launched: January 10, 2011
Policies: propose a 'Fair Tax Commission' to examine levels taxation and government revenue, support the inclusion of large industrial emitters into the carbon tax, support for the Evergreen Line and light rail to the Western Communities, introduce an Endangered Species Act, support the ban on offshore oil exploration and the ban on North Coast tanker traffic, work to implement the recommendations of the Select Standing Committee on Aquaculture.

Dana Larsen
Larsen was leader of the BC Marijuana Party from 2001 to 2003 when he resigned to join the NDP. In 2008 he was a federal NDP candidate for West Vancouver-Sunshine Coast-Sea to Sky Country but resigned after a video surfaced of him driving after using marijuana and hallucinogenic drugs.

Larsen's eligibility to run for the party leadership is at issue with party president Moe Sihota stating that Larsen's party membership has lapsed. Larsen responded by saying there was a "clerical error" as his donation to the party was processed but his membership was not. Sihota also says that even if Larsen renews his membership he may be ineligible due to the controversy surrounding his federal candidacy in 2008. The party's rules committee will set eligibility requirements in January; Sihota says that as a result Larsen "may be ultimately ineligible" regardless of his party membership status.
Date campaign launched: December 29, 2010
Policies: Legally tax and regulate marijuana, increase minimum wage to $10/hour indexed to inflation, ban corporate and union donations to political parties, promote the party's 'Sustainable BC' platform in the next election, work towards decriminalizing the sex trade

Potential/withdrawn candidates
Potential candidates that declined to run
 Dawn Black, MLA New Westminster
 Spencer Chandra Herbert, MLA for Vancouver-West End
 Derek Corrigan, mayor of Burnaby and husband of Burnaby-Deer Lake MLA Kathy Corrigan announced support for John Horgan
 Nathan Cullen, MP for Skeena-Bulkley Valley
 Corky Evans, former MLA for Nelson-Creston and Cabinet Minister 
 Rob Fleming, MLA for Victoria-Swan Lake, announced support for Farnworth.
 George Heyman, executive director of the Sierra Club of BC, former president of the B.C. Government and Service Employees' Union.
 Peter Julian, MP for Burnaby-New Westminster
 Leonard Krog, MLA for Nanaimo, announced support for Farnworth
 Jenny Kwan, MLA for Vancouver-Mount Pleasant,  announced support for Farnworth
 Bruce Ralston, MLA for Surrey-Whalley, announced support for Dix.
 Gregor Robertson, mayor of Vancouver, former MLA for Vancouver-Fairview

Withdrawn candidates

Harry Lali
MLA for Fraser-Nicola (1991–2001, 2005–present), former Minister of Transportation (1998 to 2001)
Date campaign launched: January 6, 2011
Date campaign ended: February 17, 2011, endorsed Horgan on March 17, 2011
Proposed policies: Remove quotas for female and minority candidates within BC NDP

Nicholas Simons
MLA for Powell River-Sunshine Coast (2005–present)
Date campaign launched: January 5, 2011
Date campaign ended: April 7, 2011, endorsed Horgan on April 7, 2011
Policies: $12 minimum wage by 2012; increase arts and cultural funding to national average, restoring gaming grants to non-profit organizations, and make province at arm's length from B.C. Arts Council;

Timeline
 October 7, 2010: Carole James expelled Cariboo North MLA Bob Simpson out of caucus for criticizing her leadership on a Williams Lake community website.
 October 15, 2010: Norm Macdonald, MLA for Columbia River-Revelstoke, resigned as caucus chair in protest of James' decision to expel Simpson from caucus.
 November 3, 2010: BC Premier and Liberal Party Leader Gordon Campbell announces his resignation, kicking off the leadership election process for BC NDP's principal competition.
 November 19, 2010: Kootenay West MLA Katrine Conroy resigned her position as caucus whip, saying she had lost trust in B.C. NDP party leader Carole James.
 November 20, 2010: NDP Provincial Council met in Victoria. A Motion for a leadership convention in 2011 was defeated by 84% of delegates.
 December 1, 2010: Senior NDP MLA Jenny Kwan released a statement critical of James's leadership, called for leadership race.
 December 5, 2010: A scheduled meeting between James and 13 dissident MLAs was cancelled.
 December 6, 2010: Carole James announced she will step down as leader of the New Democratic Party as soon as an interim leader can be selected.
 December 29, 2010: Marijuana Activist Dana Larsen announced his candidacy.
 January 5, 2011: Powell River-Sunshine Coast MLA Nicholas Simons announced his candidacy.
 January 6, 2011: Fraser-Nicola MLA Harry Lali announced his candidacy.
 January 13, 2011: Port Coquitlam MLA Mike Farnworth announced his candidacy.
 January 17, 2011: Vancouver-Kingsway MLA Adrian Dix announced his candidacy.
 February 26, 2011: Christy Clark was selected as the new leader of the Liberal Party and Premier-Designate of British Columbia
 April 17, 2011: : Leadership convention held at the Vancouver Convention Centre with voting occurring by telephone and via internet on that date and through advance voting. Adrian Dix is elected leader on the third ballot.

Results

See also 
British Columbia New Democratic Party
British Columbia New Democratic Party leadership conventions
2011 British Columbia Liberal Party leadership election
2014 British Columbia New Democratic Party leadership election

References

British Columbia New Democratic Party leadership elections
2011 elections in Canada
2011 in British Columbia
April 2011 events in Canada
British Columbia New Democratic Party leadership election